Asb Keshan (also Romanized as Asb Keshān, Asb Kashān, and Asb Koshān) is a village in Kharturan Rural District, Beyarjomand District, Shahrud County, Semnan Province, Iran. At the 2006 census, its population was 31, in 9 families.

References 

Populated places in Shahrud County